A gallstone is a stone formed within the gallbladder from precipitated bile components. The term cholelithiasis may refer to the presence of gallstones or to any disease caused by gallstones, and choledocholithiasis refers to the presence of migrated gallstones within bile ducts.

Most people with gallstones (about 80%) are asymptomatic. However, when a gallstone obstructs the bile duct and causes acute cholestasis, a reflexive smooth muscle spasm often occurs, resulting in an intense cramp-like visceral pain in the right upper part of the abdomen known as a biliary colic (or "gallbladder attack"). This happens in 1–4% of those with gallstones each year. Complications from gallstones may include inflammation of the gallbladder (cholecystitis), inflammation of the pancreas (pancreatitis), obstructive jaundice, and infection in bile ducts (cholangitis). Symptoms of these complications may include pain that lasts longer than five hours, fever, yellowish skin, vomiting, dark urine, and pale stools.

Risk factors for gallstones include birth control pills, pregnancy, a family history of gallstones, obesity, diabetes, liver disease, or rapid weight loss. The bile components that form gallstones include cholesterol, bile salts, and bilirubin. Gallstones formed mainly from cholesterol are termed cholesterol stones, and those formed mainly from bilirubin are termed pigment stones. Gallstones may be suspected based on symptoms. Diagnosis is then typically confirmed by ultrasound. Complications may be detected using blood tests.

The risk of gallstones may be decreased by maintaining a healthy weight with exercise and a healthy diet. If there are no symptoms, treatment is usually not needed. In those who are having gallbladder attacks, surgery to remove the gallbladder is typically recommended. This can be carried out either through several small incisions or through a single larger incision, usually under general anesthesia. In rare cases when surgery is not possible, medication can be used to dissolve the stones or lithotripsy can be used to break them down.

In developed countries, 10–15% of adults experience gallstones. Gallbladder and biliary-related diseases occurred in about 104 million people (1.6% of people) in 2013 and resulted in 106,000 deaths. Gallstones are more common among women than men and occur more commonly after the age of 40. Gallstones occur more frequently among certain ethnic groups than others. For example, 48% of Native Americans experience gallstones, whereas gallstone rates in many parts of Africa are as low as 3%. Once the gallbladder is removed, outcomes are generally positive.

Definition
Gallstone disease refers to the condition where gallstones are either in the gallbladder or common bile duct. The presence of stones in the gallbladder is referred to as cholelithiasis, from the Greek chol- (bile) + lith- (stone) + -iasis (process). The presence of gallstones in the common bile duct is called choledocholithiasis, from the Greek chol- (bile) + docho- (duct) + lith- (stone) + iasis- (process). Choledocholithiasis is frequently associated with obstruction of the bile ducts, which can lead to cholangitis, from the Greek: chol- (bile) + ang- (vessel) + itis- (inflammation), a serious infection of the bile ducts. Gallstones within the ampulla of Vater can obstruct the exocrine system of the pancreas and can result in pancreatitis.

Signs and symptoms
Gallstones, regardless of size or number, are often asymptomatic. These "silent stones" do not require treatment and can remain asymptomatic even years after they form.

A characteristic symptom of a gallstone attack is the presence of colic-like pain in the upper-right side of the abdomen, often accompanied by nausea and vomiting. Pain from symptomatic gallstones may range from mild to severe and can steadily increase over a period lasting from 30 minutes to several hours. Other symptoms may include fever, as well as referred pain between the shoulder blades or below the right shoulder. If one or more gallstones block the bile ducts and cause bilirubin to leak into the bloodstream and surrounding tissue, jaundice and itching may also occur. In this case, liver enzyme levels are likely to be raised.

Often, gallbladder attacks occur after eating a heavy meal. Attacks are most common in the evening or at night.

Other complications
In rare cases, gallstones that cause severe inflammation can erode through the gallbladder into adherent bowel, potentially causing an obstruction termed gallstone ileus.

Other complications can include ascending cholangitis, which occurs when a bacterial infection causes purulent inflammation in the biliary tree and liver, and acute pancreatitis caused by blockage of the bile ducts that prevents active enzymes from being secreted into the bowel, instead damaging the pancreas. Rarely, gallbladder cancer may occur as a complication.

Risk factors
Gallstone risk increases for females (especially before menopause) and for people near or above 40 years; the condition is more prevalent among both North and South Americans and people of European descent than among other ethnicities. A lack of melatonin could significantly contribute to gallbladder stones, as melatonin inhibits cholesterol secretion from the gallbladder, enhances the conversion of cholesterol to bile, and is an antioxidant, which is able to reduce oxidative stress to the gallbladder. Gilbert syndrome has been linked to an increased risk of gallstones. Researchers believe that gallstones may be caused by a combination of factors, including inherited body chemistry, body weight, gallbladder motility (movement), and low-calorie diet. The absence of such risk factors does not, however, preclude the formation of gallstones.

Nutritional factors that may increase risk of gallstones include constipation; eating fewer meals per day; low intake of the nutrients folate, magnesium, calcium, and vitamin C; low fluid consumption; and, at least for men, a high intake of carbohydrate, a high glycemic load, and high glycemic index diet. Wine and whole-grained bread may decrease the risk of gallstones.

Rapid weight loss increases risk of gallstones. The weight loss drug orlistat is known to increase the risk of gallstones.

Cholecystokinin deficiency caused by celiac disease increases risk of gallstone formation, especially when diagnosis of celiac disease is delayed.

Pigment gallstones are most commonly seen in the developing world. Risk factors for pigment stones include hemolytic anemias (such as from sickle-cell disease and hereditary spherocytosis), cirrhosis, and biliary tract infections. People with erythropoietic protoporphyria (EPP) are at increased risk to develop gallstones. Additionally, prolonged use of proton pump inhibitors has been shown to decrease gallbladder function, potentially leading to gallstone formation.

Cholesterol modifying medications can affect gallstone formation. Statins inhibit cholesterol synthesis and there is evidence that their use may decrease the risk of getting gallstones. Fibrates increase cholesterol concentration in bile and their use has been associated with an increased risk of gallstones. Bile acid malabsorption may also be a risk.

Pathophysiology
Cholesterol gallstones develop when bile contains too much cholesterol and not enough bile salts. Besides a high concentration of cholesterol, two other factors are important in causing gallstones. The first is how often and how well the gallbladder contracts; incomplete and infrequent emptying of the gallbladder may cause the bile to become overconcentrated and contribute to gallstone formation. This can be caused by high resistance to the flow of bile out of the gallbladder due to the complicated internal geometry of the cystic duct. The second factor is the presence of proteins in the liver and bile that either promote or inhibit cholesterol crystallization into gallstones. In addition, increased levels of the hormone estrogen, as a result of pregnancy or hormone therapy, or the use of combined (estrogen-containing) forms of hormonal contraception, may increase cholesterol levels in bile and also decrease gallbladder motility, resulting in gallstone formation.

Composition

The composition of gallstones is affected by age, diet and ethnicity. On the basis of their composition, gallstones can be divided into the following types: cholesterol stones, pigment stones, and mixed stones. An ideal classification system is yet to be defined.

Cholesterol stones
Cholesterol stones vary from light yellow to dark green or brown or chalk white and are oval, usually solitary, between 2 and 3 cm long, each often having a tiny, dark, central spot. To be classified as such, they must be at least 80% cholesterol by weight (or 70%, according to the Japanese classification system). Between 35% and 90% of stones are cholesterol stones.

Pigment stones
Bilirubin ("pigment", "black pigment") stones are small, dark (often appearing black), and usually numerous. They are composed primarily of bilirubin (insoluble bilirubin pigment polymer) and calcium (calcium phosphate) salts that are found in bile. They contain less than 20% of cholesterol (or 30%, according to the Japanese classification system). Between 2% and 30% of stones are bilirubin stones.

Mixed stones
Mixed (brown pigment stones) typically contain 20–80% cholesterol (or 30–70%, according to the Japanese classification system). Other common constituents are calcium carbonate, palmitate phosphate, bilirubin and other bile pigments (calcium bilirubinate, calcium palmitate and calcium stearate). Because of their calcium content, they are often radiographically visible. They typically arise secondary to infection of the biliary tract which results in the release of β-glucuronidase (by injured hepatocytes and bacteria) which hydrolyzes bilirubin glucuronides and increases the amount of unconjugated bilirubin in bile. Between 4% and 20% of stones are mixed.

Gallstones can vary in size and shape from as small as a grain of sand to as large as a golf ball. The gallbladder may contain a single large stone or many smaller ones. Pseudoliths, sometimes referred to as sludge, are thick secretions that may be present within the gallbladder, either alone or in conjunction with fully formed gallstones.

Diagnosis
Diagnosis is typically confirmed by abdominal ultrasound. Other imaging techniques used are ERCP and MRCP. Gallstone complications may be detected on blood tests.

On abdominal ultrasound, sinking gallstones usually have posterior acoustic shadowing. In floating gallstones, reverberation echoes (or comet-tail artifact) is seen instead in a clinical condition called adenomyomatosis. Another sign is wall-echo-shadow (WES) triad (or double-arc shadow) which is also characteristic of gallstones.

A positive Murphy's sign is a common finding on physical examination during a gallbladder attack.

Prevention
Maintaining a healthy weight by getting sufficient exercise and eating a healthy diet that is high in fiber may help prevent gallstone formation.

Ursodeoxycholic acid (UDCA) appears to prevent formation of gallstones during weight loss. A high fat diet during weight loss also appears to prevent gallstones.

Treatment

Lithotripsy
Extracorporeal shock wave lithotripsy is a non-invasive method to manage gallstones that uses high-energy sound waves to disintegrate them first applied in January 1985.
Side effects of extracorporeal shock wave lithotripsy include biliary pancreatitis and liver haematoma.

Surgical
Cholecystectomy (gallbladder removal) has a 99% chance of eliminating the recurrence of cholelithiasis. The lack of a gallbladder has no negative consequences in most people, however 10 to 15% of people develop postcholecystectomy syndrome, which may cause nausea, indigestion, diarrhea, and episodes of abdominal pain.

There are two surgical options for cholecystectomy:
 Open cholecystectomy is performed via an abdominal incision (laparotomy) below the lower right ribs. Recovery typically requires 3–5 days of hospitalization, with a return to normal diet a week after release and to normal activity several weeks after release.
 Laparoscopic cholecystectomy, introduced in the 1980s, is performed via three to four small puncture holes for a camera and instruments. Post-operative care typically includes a same-day release or a one-night hospital stay, followed by a few days of home rest and pain medication. Perforation of the gall bladder is not uncommon—it has been reported in the range of 10% to 40%. Unretrieved gallstone spillage has been reported as 6% to 30%, but gallstones that are not retrieved rarely cause complications (0.08%–0.3%).

Obstruction of the common bile duct with gallstones can sometimes be relieved by endoscopic retrograde sphincterotomy (ERS) following endoscopic retrograde cholangiopancreatography (ERCP).

Medical
The medications ursodeoxycholic acid (UDCA) and chenodeoxycholic acid (CDCA) have been used in treatment to dissolve gallstones. A 2013 meta-analysis concluded that UDCA or higher dietary fat content appeared to prevent formation of gallstones during weight loss. Medical therapy with oral bile acids has been used to treat small cholesterol stones, and for larger cholesterol gallstones when surgery is either not possible or unwanted. CDCA treatment can cause diarrhea, mild reversible hepatic injury, and a small increase in the plasma cholesterol level. UDCA may need to be taken for years.

Use in traditional medicine
Gallstones can be a valued by-product of animals butchered for meat because of their use as an antipyretic and antidote in the traditional medicine of some cultures, particularly traditional Chinese medicine. The most highly prized gallstones tend to be sourced from old dairy cows, termed calculus bovis or niu-huang (yellow thing of cattle) in Chinese. Some slaughterhouses carefully scrutinize workers for gallstone theft.

See also 
 Porcelain gallbladder
 Mirizzi's syndrome

References

External links 

 

Abdominal pain
Articles containing video clips
Gallbladder disorders
Hepatology
Wikipedia medicine articles ready to translate
Wikipedia emergency medicine articles ready to translate
Steatorrhea-related diseases